Philippe Paul (born 25 January 1965) is a member of the Senate of France, representing the Finistère department.  He is a member of the Union for a Popular Movement.

References
Page on the Senate website (in French)

1965 births
Living people
The Republicans (France) politicians
Union for a Popular Movement politicians
French Senators of the Fifth Republic
Senators of Finistère
People from Douarnenez
Mayors of places in Brittany